The Diocese of Matamoros is a Latin Church ecclesiastical territory or diocese of the Catholic Church in the northeast part of the state of Tamaulipas, Mexico, along the border with Texas. The diocese is a suffragan in the ecclesiastical province of the metropolitan Archdiocese of Monterrey.

History

Antecedents
When the first Catholic missionaries, de Silva and Puellea, arrived in 1793, this region was under the ecclesiastical jurisdiction of the Diocese of Linares. However, beginning with the first bishop, Fray Antonio de Jesús Sacedón, all bishops had resided in Monterrey.

With the papal bull "Ad futuram rei memoriam", Pius IX created the Apostolic Vicariate of Tamaulipas, on August 13, 1861, under the pastoral care of Francisco de la Concepción Ramírez.

Less than a decade later on March 12, 1870, Pius IX promulgated Papal Bull "Apostolicam in universas", thereby elevating the Vicariate to diocese with its seat in Ciudad Victoria. Appointed as the first bishop of Tamaulipas was Mons. Ignacio Montes de Oca y Obregón, who had been the personal chaplain to Emperor Maximilian.

In 1922, the episcopal seat was moved by Bishop Jose Guadalupe Ortíz y López from the state capital Ciudad Victoria to Tampico, which had grown to become the largest city in the state. Tampico, located in the far southeast corner of the state, had become Tamaulipas' economic center due to its port, trade and the discovery of oil.

In 1958, Tamaulipas was divided into two dioceses: Matamoros and Tampico.

On another note, the main cathedral found in Matamoros, Tamaulipas has several written accounts – like newspapers, burials, marriages, confirmations, and government documents – of the Texas Revolution.

Diocese of Matamoros
With the advent of extensive irrigation, prosperity and population growth came to northern Tamaulipas. On February 16, 1958, Pius XII promulgated Papal Bull "Haud inani", creating a new diocese, extending from San Fernando to Nuevo Laredo, with its seat in Matamoros. The parish church of Our Lady of Refuge became the cathedral. Pope John XXIII named the first bishop of the new diocese: Mons. Estanislao Alcaraz y Figueroa. Mons. Alcaraz was consecrated bishop on April 12, 1959.

Bishops
 1st bishop: Rev. Estanislao Alcaraz y Figueroa, 1959-1968

Pope John XXIII chose the first Bishop of Matamoros, Dr. Estanislao Alcaraz y Figueroa, on January 20, 1959. He was consecrated April 12, 1959 in the Cathedral of Our Lady of Refuge. In March 1968, Bishop Alcaráz was named Bishop of San Luis Potosí.

 2nd bishop: Rev. Sabás Magaña García, 1969-1990

Pope Paul VI chose Dr. Sabás Magaña García as successor on December 30, 1968, receiving consecration in Rome on January 6, 1969. Rev. Magaña served as Bishop of Matamoros for over 21 years, until his death, November 7, 1990.

 3rd bishop: Rev. Francisco Javier Chavolla Ramos, 1992-2004

In June 1992, Pope John Paul II chose Rev. Francisco Javier Chavolla Ramos to succeed Bishop Magaña. Bishop Chavolla headed the Diocese of Matamoros until February 2004, when he was named Bishop of Toluca.

 4th bishop: Rev. Faustino Armendáriz Jiménez, 2004–2011

In December 2004, John Paul II, named Mons. Faustino Armendáriz Jiménez 4th Bishop of Matamoros. After receiving episcopal ordination, he took possession of the Diocese on February 23, 2005. Named Bishop of Querétaro on 20 April 2011.

5th bishop S.E. Mons. Ruy Rendón Leal, 2011–present
In July 2011 appointed by pope Benedict XVI.

6th bishop S.E. Mons. Eugenio Andrés Lira Rugarcía, 2016–present
In September 2016 appointed by pope Francis.

Other priest of this diocese who became bishop
Margarito Salazar Cárdenas, appointed Bishop of Matehuala, San Luís Potosí in 2018

External links
Diocese of Matamoros Website (in Spanish) 
Diocese of Matamoros at David M. Cheney's website

Matamoros
Matamoros, Tamaulipas
Matamoros, Roman Catholic Diocese of
Matamoros
Matamoros
1958 establishments in Mexico